Hounds Below are an American rock band from Ferndale, consisting of Jason Stollsteimer (lead vocals, guitar), Will Shattuck (drums) and Adam Michael Lee Padden (bass, backing vocals). They were formed in 2009, while Stollsteimer was still recording and touring with the Von Bondies. After they broke up, he started recruiting members into the Hounds Below and started recording their debut album, You Light Me Up In The Dark, which was released in 2012.

Touring
Hounds Below have shared the stage with Black Rebel Motorcycle Club, Ash, The Heavy, The Raveonettes, The Grates, The Horrors, The Black Angels, Company of Thieves, Airborne Toxic Event, The Like, Band of Skulls and The Whigs.

See also
Music of Detroit

References

External links
 Official website

Indie rock musical groups from Michigan
Musical groups from Michigan
Musical groups established in 2009
Musical collectives
2009 establishments in Michigan